Hon. François Godbout (born April 10, 1938) is a Canadian lawyer, sports administrator and former tennis player.

A native of Waterloo, Quebec, Godbout made his debut for the Canada Davis Cup team in 1959 and came up against Rod Laver in his first rubber, losing in four sets. He had a win over Arthur Ashe in his run to the third round of the 1961 U.S. National Championships, which was his best grand slam performance. After finishing his career he moved into tennis administration, serving stints as President of the Quebec Tennis Federation (1969 to 1971) and Tennis Canada (1985 to 1987). He was a 1994 inductee into Quebec Sports Hall of Fame.

See also
List of Canada Davis Cup team representatives

References

External links
 
 
 

1938 births
Living people
Canadian male tennis players
Racket sportspeople from Quebec
Tennis players at the 1959 Pan American Games
Tennis players at the 1967 Pan American Games
Pan American Games competitors for Canada